The 2014 Boca Raton Bowl was a post-season American college football bowl game that was played on December 23, 2014 at FAU Stadium on the campus of Florida Atlantic University in Boca Raton, Florida.  The first edition of the Boca Raton Bowl, it featured the Conference USA champion Marshall Thundering Herd against the Mid-American Conference champion Northern Illinois Huskies.  The game began at 6:00 p.m. EST and aired on ESPN. It was one of the 2014–15 bowl games that concluded the 2014 FBS football season.  Marshall beat Northern Illinois by a score of 52–23.

Teams
The game featured the Conference USA champion Marshall Thundering Herd against the Mid-American Conference champion Northern Illinois Huskies.

This was the eighth overall meeting between these two teams, with Northern Illinois previously leading the series 4–3. The previous time these two teams met was in 2001.

Marshall Thundering Herd

After finishing the regular season with a 12–1 record and winning their first Conference USA championship over the Louisiana Tech Bulldogs by a score of 26–23, the Thundering Herd accepted their bid to the Boca Raton Bowl.

This was Marshall's second Florida bowl game; they had previously won the 2011 Beef 'O' Brady's Bowl, defeating the FIU Panthers by a score of 20–10.

Northern Illinois Huskies

After finishing the regular season with an 11–2 record and winning the MAC Championship Game over the Bowling Green Falcons by a score of 51–17, the Huskies accepted their bid to the Boca Raton Bowl.

This was Northern Illinois' second bowl game in South Florida; in their most high-profile game to date, they had appeared in the 2013 Orange Bowl, losing to the Florida State Seminoles by a score of 31–10.

Game summary

Scoring summary

Source:

Statistics

References

External links
 Box score at ESPN

Boca Raton Bowl
Boca Raton Bowl
Marshall Thundering Herd football bowl games
Northern Illinois Huskies football bowl games
Boca Raton Bowl
Boca Raton Bowl